Aulaad is a 1962 Pakistani Urdu-language black and white film. The film was released on 3 August 1962, and was directed by S. M. Yusuf who also co-produced it with F. M. Sardar under banner F & Y Movies. The story, dialogues and lyrics were written by Fayyaz Hashmi. The cast included Nayyar Sultana, Habib, Waheed Murad, Talish and Rehana. The music composition was done by A. Hameed. The film revolves around the struggles and greatness of a woman as a mother and wife. It marked the debut of Murad as an actor who later went on to become a superstar of Pakistani cinema.

This was a super-hit musical film of 1962 and won two awards at 1962 Nigar Awards; Best director and Best Actress (Sultana).

Cast
 Nayyar Sultana
 Habib  
 Waheed Murad 
 Rehana
 Talish
 Sultan Rahi (as a guest appearance)

Music
The music of the film was composed by music director  A. Hameed. The songs were written by Fayyaz Hashmi.

Awards
Aulaad received 2 awards at 6th Nigar Awards in the following categories at :

 Best director - S. M. Yusuf
 Best actress - Nayyar Sultana

References

External links 
 

1960s Urdu-language films
1962 films
Pakistani black-and-white films
Pakistani romantic drama films
Films scored by A. Hameed
Pakistani buddy films
Nigar Award winners
Urdu-language Pakistani films